A chemical restraint is a form of medical restraint in which a drug is used to restrict the freedom or movement of a patient or in some cases to sedate the patient. Chemical restraint is used in emergency, acute, and psychiatric settings to perform surgery or to reduce agitation, aggression or violent behaviours; it may also be used to control or punish unruly behaviours. Chemical restraint is also referred to as a "Psychopharmacologic Agent", "Psychotropic Drug" or "Therapeutic Restraints" in certain legal writing.

In the UK, NICE recommends the use of chemical restraint for acute behaviour disturbances (ABD), but only after verbal calming and de-escalation techniques have been attempted. It is viewed as superior to physical restraint, with physical restraints only being recommended for the administration of a chemical restraint.

In the United States, no drugs are presently approved by the U.S. Food and Drug Administration (FDA) for use as chemical restraints. Drugs that are often used as chemical restraints include antipsychotics, benzodiazepines, and dissociative anesthetics such as ketamine. A systematic review in 2019 advised the use of intravenous haloperidol (a short half-life, first-generation antipsychotic) alone or in conjunction with lorazepam or midazolam (short half-life benzodiazepines), but said more research was needed.

The Human Rights Watch wrote a report on the use of chemical restraints amongst the elderly in the US. It concluded that antipsychotic drugs are sometimes used almost by default to control difficult-to-manage residents. The FDA estimates 15,000 elderly individuals in nursing homes die each year due to the unnecessary use of anti-psychotics. According to the Nursing Home Reform Act, individuals have the right to be free from physical or chemical restraints imposed for purposes of discipline or convenience and not required to treat the resident's medical symptoms. 

The use of chemical restraint has been criticized. It is sometimes misused by health care workers for the convenience of the staff rather than the benefit of the patient, with workers using them to prevent patients from resisting care, rather than improving the health of the patient; it can cause more confusion in patients, slowing their recovery; and it can be unclear whether drugs used for chemical restraint are necessary to treat an underlying mental health condition or whether they are being used to sedate the patient. Patients can view chemical restraint as a violation of integrity and find the experience traumatic.

Notes

References

Physical restraint